Cecil John Doty (1907–1990) was an American architect, notable for planning a consistent architectural framework for the U.S. National Park Service's ambitious Mission 66 program in the 1950s and 1960s. Doty spent his childhood in May, Oklahoma, then attended Oklahoma A&M (now Oklahoma State University), and received a degree in architectural engineering in 1928. During the Great Depression that immediately followed Doty's graduation, Doty found intermittent work, but was unable to establish a business in Oklahoma City. In order to make a living, Doty signed up with the Civilian Conservation Corps, first as a file clerk, then as an architect in the state parks program.

Doty was hired by Park Service design director Herbert Maier to complete plans for a museum building at Glacier National Park, and absorbed Maier's style by studying the design guidelines issued by Maier, which contained prototype designs executed by Maier and Park Service staff for national and state parks. By January 1935, Doty was promoted to associate engineer and given responsibility, together with landscape architect Harry Cornell, for the state parks of Kansas and Oklahoma. The next year he became regional architect, and in 1937 moved to Santa Fe, New Mexico to work with Maier at the new regional office, where he took up work on national park structures. Doty designed his new workplace, the Santa Fe Regional Office, while still in Oklahoma, completing the design after moving to Santa Fe.

Doty moved to the San Francisco Office in 1940, where he took on work for the new White Sands National Monument. During World War II Doty worked on major war effort projects like the Alcan Highway and Shasta Dam. Following the war in 1946 he became the Park Service's regional architect in 1948. He designed the lodge at Hurricane Ridge in Olympic National Park and the Joshua Tree National Park administration building. In 1954 Doty joined the Western Office of Design and Construction, where he assumed a leadership role in the Mission 66 project.

Doty spent some of his post-Mission 66 time with the park service on projects at the National Mall in Washington. retiring in 1968. He lived in Walnut Creek, California in the 1980s.

Works
National Park Service Southwest Regional Office, 1937
Visitor Center, Grand Canyon National Park, 1955
Visitor Center, Carlsbad Caverns National Park
Visitor Center, Colorado National Monument Visitor Center Complex, Colorado National Monument Fruita, Colorado, listed on the National Register of Historic Places
Visitor Center, Zion National Park, with Cannon and Mullen, 1957–58
Visitor Center, Bryce Canyon National Park, with Cannon and Mullen, 1957–58
Visitor Center, Wupatki National Monument, with Lescher and Mahoney
Visitor Center, Organ Pipe Cactus National Monument, with Lescher and Mahoney
Visitor Center, Canyon de Chelly National Monument
Madison Junction Visitor Center, Yellowstone National Park (demolished)
Visitor Center, Mount Rushmore National Memorial (demolished)
Visitor Center, Montezuma Castle National Monument, 1958
Furnace Creek Visitor Center, Death Valley National Park, 1959
Hoh Visitor Center, Olympic National Park
Visitor Center, Sunset Crater National Monument
Visitor Center, Curecanti National Recreation Area
Visitor Center, Tonto National Monument
Visitor Center, Navajo National Monument
Visitor Center, Walnut Canyon National Monument
Flamingo Marina, Everglades National Park, 1958
Visitor Center, Glen Canyon National Recreation Area, 1963–1964
Visitor Center, Natural Bridges National Monument, 1964
Hurricane Ridge Visitor Center, Olympic National Park, 1964
Logan Pass Visitor Center, Going-to-the-Sun Rd., 18 mi. W. of US 89, Saint Mary, Montana, listed on the National Register of Historic Places
Visitor Center, Capulin Volcano National Monument, 1963

References

1907 births
1990 deaths
Mission 66
20th-century American architects
Architects from Oklahoma